Mary Lister McCammon (23 August 1927 – 11 April 2008) was a British mathematician and Professor at Pennsylvania State University. She was the first woman to complete a doctoral degree in mathematics at Imperial College London in 1953.

Early life and education 
McCammon studied mathematics at the University of London, graduating with a bachelor's degree in 1949 and a master's in 1950. She was the first woman to earn a PhD in mathematics at Imperial College London gaining her doctorate in 1953 for her work on mathematical models of viscous flow supervised by D. N. de G. Allen.

Career and research
She joined Massachusetts Institute of Technology for postdoctoral research. McCammon joined Pennsylvania State University in 1954. She introduced classes in numerical analysis, calculus and computer programming. She served as director for undergraduate studies twice, first between 1963 and 1975, and again from 1988 to 1998. McCammon was promoted to Professor in 1992. She created the first mathematics placement test, which were given to all freshmen.

Awards and honours 
 1982 Christian Mary Lindback Award for Distinguished Teaching
 1984 Teresa Cohen Service Award
 1991 Eberly College of Science Distinguished Service Award
 1998 C.I. Knoll Award for Excellence in Teaching

In 2000, Pennsylvania State University announced the Mary Lister McCammon Award, a scholarship for undergraduate studies, as well as the McCammon Award for Distinguished Undergraduate Teaching named in her honour. In 2019, Imperial College London announced the Mary Lister McCammon Summer Research Fellowship for undergraduate women mathematicians.

References 

2008 deaths
Women mathematicians
British women mathematicians
Pennsylvania State University alumni
Alumni of the University of London
Alumni of Imperial College London
Year of birth uncertain
1927 births